The 1999–2000 Washington Capitals season was the Washington Capitals 26th season in the National Hockey League (NHL).

Offseason
Owner Abe Pollin sold the Capitals to an investor group headed by America Online president Ted Leonsis on May 12, 1999.

Regular season

The Capitals tied the St. Louis Blues for the fewest short-handed goals allowed, with just 3.

Final standings

Schedule and results

Playoffs

(2) Washington Capitals vs. (7) Pittsburgh Penguins

Player statistics

Regular season
Scoring

Goaltending

Playoffs
Scoring

Goaltending

Awards and records

Transactions

Draft picks
Washington's draft picks at the 1999 NHL Entry Draft held at the FleetCenter in Boston, Massachusetts.

See also
 1999–2000 NHL season

References
 
 

Wash
Wash
Washington Capitals seasons
Cap
Cap